The Marash earthquake occurred in the area of Marash during the early morning hours of November 29, 1114.

The magnitude was larger than 7.4.

Marash was an important city with a large Christian population at that time. According to the contemporary sources, the city was completely underground. Matthew of Edessa records that no one living in the city survived the earthquake and that about 40,000 people living in Marash died. That number seems excessive since the population of the town is estimated to have been a few thousand only.  Michael the Syrian records that the city of Marash is a tomb for its own people. Al-Azimi records that it was dark before the earthquake, and then it snowed and covered with snow on all sides. Apart from Marash, the earthquake also caused destruction in Elbistan, Sis, Mopsuestia, Keysun, Sümeysat (Samsat), Hısn-ı mansûr (Adıyaman), Raban, Edessa, Antioch, Harran, Aleppo, Azaz, Esârib, Zerdana and Balis. The earthquake caused the thirteen towers of the Edessa city wall and a part of the Harran city wall to collapse. While many monasteries and villages were destroyed in the city of Sis, tens of thousands of people died. It also destroyed the Azez fortress and caused the death of four hundred people. William of Tyre also records that this earthquake caused the most damage in the coastal region of Cilicia, Isauria and Northern Syria. The lord of Marash and the bishop of Marash, although both unnamed in the sources, were killed in the earthquake.

References

Sources

12th century in the Middle East
12th-century earthquakes
Late Medieval Anatolia
1114
1114 in Asia